East Side, West Side is a 1947 novel by the American writer Marcia Davenport. Set in New York City immediately after World War II, an unhappily married woman's life comes to a crisis in a single week. As with her two previous novels it was a commercial success, making the Publishers Weekly annual list of bestsellers.

Film adaptation
In 1949 it was adapted into a film of the same title by MGM. Directed by Mervyn LeRoy, it starred Barbara Stanwyck, James Mason, Van Heflin and Ava Gardner.

References

Bibliography
 Goble, Alan. The Complete Index to Literary Sources in Film. Walter de Gruyter, 1999.
 Kirkpatrick, D. L. Twentieth-century Romance and Gothic Writers. Gale Research, 1982.

1947 American novels
Novels by Marcia Davenport
Novels set in New York City
American novels adapted into films